Cry Wolf is a 1947 American mystery film directed by Peter Godfrey and featuring Errol Flynn and Barbara Stanwyck, based on the novel of the same name by Marjorie Carleton.

Plot
Hearing that her husband is dead, Sandra Marshall arrives at his prominent family's remote estate to claim her inheritance. She receives a cold reception, especially from her husband's uncle, research scientist Mark Caldwell, who had not known about her or the marriage and accuses her of scheming. He allows her to stay in the mansion while the legal details are settled, and as the two become better acquainted, they develop a less contentious relationship.

Caldwell's teenage niece Julie welcomes Sandra but claims that her uncle is holding her prisoner on the estate, that strange things are occurring in an area of the mansion that she is forbidden to enter and that the older family members and their servants may not be telling the truth about the recent death. Although Caldwell insists that Julie simply has an overactive imagination, Sandra wonders what to believe and whom to trust. Increasingly convinced that something is amiss at the mansion, she becomes willing to take risks to uncover what it is.

Cast
 Errol Flynn as Mark Caldwell
 Barbara Stanwyck as Sandra Marshall
 Geraldine Brooks as Julie Demarest
 Richard Basehart as James Caldwell Demarest
 Jerome Cowan as Senator Charles Caldwell
 John Ridgely as Jackson Laidell
 Patricia Barry as Angela 
 Rory Mallinson as Becket
 Helene Thimig as Marta
 Paul Stanton as Davenport
 Barry Bernard as Roberts
 Lisa Golm as Mrs. Laidell

Production

Original novel
The novel was published in January 1945. The New York Times wrote: "[T]he plot has pace; the manse is traditionally eerie, the heroine is charming. Situations and dialogue, however, are often clumsily handled." The Chicago Tribune called the book "a spicy piece".

Development
In April 1945, Warner Bros. bought the film rights as a vehicle for Barbara Stanwyck. Catherine Turney was assigned to write the script and Dennis Morgan announced as the male lead.

In March 1946, Errol Flynn was announced as the male lead and Peter Godfrey as director. The film was produced by Flynn's Thomson Productions company.

Geraldine Brooks and Richard Basehart were both New York stage actors who had recently accepted contracts with Warner Bros.

Shooting
Filming started in May 1946 and commenced in August.

Reception
The film was not released until July 1947.

Critical
In a contemporary review for The New York Times, critic Bosley Crowther wrote: "[A]ll of the dark and ominous doings in a good three-quarters of this film—all of the fearful things encountered by a presumed young widow in a big dark house, ruled over by an icy young scientist who maintains a forbidden laboratory in one wing—are just so much clear and calculated dust in the audience's eyes. The final explanation of the mystery is ridiculous and banal. ... As it draws on toward its payoff, the disappointment looms. And when it is plain that the whole thing is a mockery—well, you know how those shepherds must have felt when that naughty little joker brought them running with his baseless cry of 'Wolf!'"

The Wall Street Journal wrote that the film was "often as dull as it is frightening because its melodramatic story is full of cliches... without tommy gun or sword, Mr. Flynn seems unhappily wooden." The Christian Science Monitor wrote that it "grips the attention and holds it right through...the result is something well above average."

The Los Angeles Times called the film "murky" and "fairly opaque" although it felt that audiences "are likely to be impressed by the performance of Flynn."

Box office
The film was moderately successful at the box office. Variety estimated its rentals in the U.S. and Canada at $2 million.

According to Warner Bros. records, the film earned $1,842,000 domestically and $848,000 foreign.

References

Other references
 Tony Thomas, Rudy Behlmer * Clifford McCarty, The Films of Errol Flynn, Citadel Press, 1969 p 147.

External links
 
 
 
 
 

1947 films
1947 mystery films
American mystery films
American black-and-white films
Film noir
Films scored by Franz Waxman
Films based on American novels
Warner Bros. films
Films directed by Peter Godfrey
Films set in country houses
1940s English-language films
1940s American films